Beverly Hills Vamp is a 1989 direct to video comedy horror film directed by Fred Olen Ray and starring Eddie Deezen and Britt Ekland.

Plot summary
Three nerds, Kyle (Eddie Deezen), Brock (Tim Conway Jr.) & Russell (Tom Shell), want to make a movie, so they take their script to Brock's uncle Aaron Pendleton (Jay Richardson), a "famous" movie director in Hollywood. While Uncle Aaron is reading the script, the boys do a little sightseeing. First stop is a call girl service in Beverly Hills where they meet Madame Cassandra (Britt Ekland) and her girls; Jessica (Debra Lamb), Claudia (Jillian Kesner) and Kristina (Michelle Bauer), all of whom are vampires. Kyle, trying to be faithful to his girlfriend Molly (Brigitte Burdine), leaves the brothel. When neither Brock nor Russell return home that night, Kyle revisits the brothel only to find that no one remembers his friends. Kyle goes to the police, but they advise him to wait until his friends show up. Becoming worried, Kyle calls Molly who catches the next flight to Hollywood. While explaining the disappearance to Uncle Aaron, Brock shows up, looking pale and clammy and with two bites on his neck. Sure that they are dealing with vampires, they get advice (and props) from Father Ferraro (Robert Quarry) and, one by one, Kyle destroys the vampires...except for Brock and Molly.

Cast
Eddie Deezen as Kyle Carpenter
Britt Ekland as Madame Cassandra
Tom Shell as Russell
Tim Conway Jr. as Brock Pendleton
Michelle Bauer as Kristina
Jillian Kesner as Claudia
Debra Lamb as Jessica
Jay Richardson as Aaron Pendleton
Brigitte Burdine as Molly
Robert Quarry as Father Ferraro
Ralph Lucas as Balthazar
Dawn Waldman as Cleaning Lady

Reception
A reviewer for The Age gave Beverly Hills Vamp a mixed review, comparing Deezen to Jerry Lewis and remarking that the movie managed to be "entertaining in a schlocky sort of way". Jerry D. Metz Jr noted that the film did not adhere to typical slasher tropes, as Deezen's character chose to remain faithful to his girlfriend when he and his friends go to a brothel, as opposed to indulging.

Nick Prueher of the Found Footage Festival posted the trailer to the Festival's website, writing that Vidmark's trailers "were always better than the movie you were about to watch".

References

External links

Beverly Hills Vamp on Rotten Tomatoes

Films directed by Fred Olen Ray
1980s comedy horror films
1988 films
Vampire comedy films
American comedy horror films
1988 comedy films
1980s English-language films
American vampire films
1980s American films